Bramhapuri Assembly constituency (also spelled Brahmapuri) is one of the 288 Vidhan Sabha (legislative assembly) constituencies of Maharashtra state, western India. This constituency is located in Chandrapur district, and is part of Gadchiroli–Chimur (Lok Sabha constituency) since the 2009 elections.

Geographical scope
The constituency comprises Sawali taluka, Sindewahi taluka, parts of Brahmapuri taluka revenue circles of Gangalwadi, Brahmapuri and Brahmapuri Municipal Council.

Members of Legislative assembly

Election Results

1962 Assembly Election 
 Govinda Bijaji Meshram (INC) : 23114 votes 
 Namdeorao Vishnuji Nagdovate	(REP) : 12419

2004 Assembly Election 
 Atul Devidas Deshkar (BJP) :	52953 votes 
	Misar Damodhar Shravan	(NCP) :	38777

2009 Assembly Election 
 Atul Devidas Deshkar (BJP) : 50,340 votes 
 Gaddamwar Sandeep Wamanrao (IND) : 44845

2014 Assembly Election 
 Vijay Wadettiwar (Congress) : 70,373 votes 
 Atul Devidas Deshkar (BJP) : 56,763

2019 Assembly Election 
 Vijay Wadettiwar (Congress) : 96,726 votes

References

Assembly constituencies of Maharashtra